Ro-35 was an Imperial Japanese Navy Kaichū type submarine, the lead unit of the K6 sub-class. Completed and commissioned in March 1943, she served in World War II and was sunk during her first war patrol in August 1943.

Design and description
The submarines of the K6 sub-class were versions of the preceding K5 sub-class with greater range and diving depth. They displaced  surfaced and  submerged.

For surface running, the boats were powered by two  diesel engines, each driving one propeller shaft. When submerged each propeller was driven by a  electric motor. They could reach  on the surface and  underwater.

The boats were armed with four internal bow  torpedo tubes and carried a total of ten torpedoes. They were also armed with a single  L/40 anti-aircraft gun and two single  AA guns.

Construction and commissioning

Ro-35 was laid down on 9 October 1941 by Mitsubishi at Kobe, Japan, as the lead unit of the K6 subclass with the name Submarine No. 201. Renamed Ro-35, she was launched on 4 June 1942 and provisionally attached to the Maizuru Naval District that day. She was completed and commissioned on 25 March 1943.

Service history

Upon commissioning, Ro-35 was attached formally to the Maizuru Naval District, and on 1 April 1943 she was assigned to Submarine Squadron 11 for workups.

On 17 July 1943, Ro-35 departed Kure, Japan, bound for Truk. During her voyage, she was reassigned to the 1st Submarine Unit in the 6th Fleet on 20 July 1943. She arrived at Truk in early August 1943.

Ro-35 got underway from Truk on 16 August 1943 to begin her first war patrol, ordered to conduct a reconnaissance of the Espiritu Santo area in the New Hebrides. At 17:00 on 25 August 1943, she transmitted a message in which she reported having sighted an Allied convoy of six transports. The Japanese never heard from her again.

At 19:12 on 25 August 1943, the United States Navy destroyer  was escorting a convoy bound from the New Hebrides to the southeastern Solomon Islands when she made radar contact on a vessel east of the Solomons,  from Ndeni in the Santa Cruz Islands.

Although the Japanese submarine  was in the same area at the time, the submarine that Patterson sank was probably Ro-35. The headquarters of the 6th Fleet attempted to contact Ro-35 on 8 September 1943, but she did not reply. On 2 October 1943, the Imperial Japanese Navy declared  to be presumed lost with all 66 hands off Espiritu Santo. She was stricken from the Navy list on 1 December 1943.

In June 1944, Fleet Radio Unit, Melbourne (FRUMEL), an Allied signals intelligence unit headquartered at Melbourne, Australia, reported that a Japanese submarine it identified as Ro-35 was making a supply voyage from Truk to Kusaie.

Notes

References

Further reading
 

Ro-35-class submarines
Kaichū type submarines
Ships built by Mitsubishi Heavy Industries
1942 ships
World War II submarines of Japan
Japanese submarines lost during World War II
World War II shipwrecks in the Pacific Ocean
Maritime incidents in August 1943
Submarines sunk by United States warships
Ships lost with all hands